de Jager is an occupational surname of Dutch origin, meaning "the hunter".  It may refer to:

de Jager:
Bartholomeus de Jager (fl. 1650s), Dutch privateer
Benjamin de Jager (born 1980), South African rugby player in Italy
Benjamin (Bennie) de Jager (born 1985), South African guitarist for Straatligkinders and Moses Metro Man
Cor de Jager (1925–2001), Dutch army general and NATO Military Committee chairman
 (1936–2003), South African sculptor
Dirk De Jager (born c. 1972), Air Transat pilot
Fanie de Jager (born 1949), South African singer
Geoffrey de Jager (born 1950), South African entrepreneur and philanthropist
Gerrit de Jager (born 1954), Dutch comic-artist
 (1634–1694), Dutch orientalist
Jacob de Jager (1923–2004), Dutch Mormon leader
Jan Kees de Jager (born 1969), Dutch IT entrepreneur and politician
Jip de Jager (1912–2000), South African Politician and advocate for German education
Johanna Dejager (born 1969), Canadian bodybuilder
John-Laffnie de Jager (born 1973), South African tennis player
Jost de Jager (born 1965), German politician
Kees de Jager (1921–2021), Dutch astronomer
Lood de Jager (born 1992), South African rugby player
Louis de Jager (born 1987), South African golfer
Nick de Jager (born 1990), South African rugby player
Nikkie de Jager (born 1994), birth name of Dutch make-up artist and beauty vlogger NikkieTutorials
Penney de Jager (born 1948), Dutch dancer and choreographer
Peter de Jager (born 1955), South African born Canadian, best known as "the Paul Revere for the year-2000 computer crisis." (NYTimes)
Shaun de Jager (born 1991),  South African sprinter
Stephanus Johannes de Jager (fl. 1984), South African arms smuggler
de Jaeger:
Charles de Jaeger (1911–2000), Austrian-born cameraman for the BBC
Maria De Jaeger (1901–2011), Belgian supercentenarian

See also
de Jagers Pass, South African mountain pass
De Jager v Sisana, South African law case
3798 de Jager, asteroid named after Cornelis/Kees de Jager
Jäger (surname)

Dutch-language surnames
Afrikaans-language surnames
Occupational surnames